Shnogh (also Romanized as Shnokh;) is a town in the Lori Province of Armenia.
Shnogh is a village in the region of Lori in Armenia at 41°9'0" north of the equator and 44°50'24" east of the Greenwich Prime Meridian. 
The population is approximately 3250 (870 families)(1996).

Shnogh is a big village. The name comes from Armenian roots with the meaning abundant soil. Shnogh has rich agricultural potential. It is one of the old, known and prosperous settlements in the region.

Shnogh has middle and art schools, culture house, library, cinema, kinder garden, hospital, ambulatory, drug-stores, museum of history etc.
Shnogh is in the east part of mountain area named Gugarq, at the right site slope of river Debed, in a very complex geographical relief (which makes very beautiful and unusual view of village).

The weather is mild, close to dry subtropical, annual mean temperature is 11.1 C, maximum recorded 38C, and minimum recorded 22C.  
In the surrounded mountains are many different mines such as copper, molybdenum, iron, which were mined in ancient times. The forests are abundant with rich and valuable trees, grass, wild berries and fruits. The agriculture is developed from ancient times.

History 

The history of Shnogh is closely related to the fortress named Kaitsoon (10th-11th centuries). The name change Kaitsoon-Shnogh was made in later times (19th century). Shnogh has shared the difficult and dramatic history of Armenia. In the 10th and 11th centuries in this area were under the rule of the Kyurikian princes; in 1118, Kaitsoon was attached to Georgia by David Builder King of Georgia. In 13th-15th centuries, the fortress was under Zakarian princes (Armenian), since the 13th century it was attacked many times by Seljuk-Turks and Mongol-Tatars. Since the 17th century, the Persian King Abas has continually removed the Armenian and Georgian natives from this area and sending there Turk nomads. The area was attacked many times further. In 1919, Lori region was declared as neutral zone to protect area from Turkey. In the end of 1920 to prevent the progress of Turkish army, Georgia sent his armies to Lori and declared army regime in region. After ending the Armenian-Turkish war, however, Georgia claimed the region and did not remove its armies from Lori. In November 1920, the natives with the help of the army removed Georgian forces from the  Lori region when Armenia entered the Soviet Union.

After the Armenian declaration of independence on September 21, 1991, the village entered the new times with many economical problems and continues to recover its welfare.

References

World Gazeteer: Armenia – World-Gazetteer.com

Populated places in Lori Province